Malcolm Mackay may refer to:

Malcolm Mackay (Australian politician) (1919-1998), an Australian clergyman and politician
Malcolm MacKay (Canadian politician) (born 1994), a Canadian politician
Malcolm Mackay (writer) (born 1981), Scottish writer

See also
Malcolm McKay (disambiguation)